Luke Browne may refer to:

Luke Browne (politician), see COVID-19 pandemic in Saint Vincent and the Grenadines
Luke Browne, character in The Cured

See also
Luke Brown (disambiguation)